Polygonum striatulum, the striped knotweed or Texas knotweed, is endemic to the U.S. state of Texas but cultivated as an ornamental elsewhere.

Polygonum striatulum is a perennial herb that spreads by means of underground rhizomes. Inflorescences are at the top of the plant and also at the tips of branches, each with 2–6 white to pinkish flowers.

References

striatulatum
Flora of Texas
Plants described in 1904